Initiative Measure No. 976 (I-976) is a ballot initiative in the U.S. state of Washington that appeared on the ballot on November 5, 2019. The initiative was brought to the state legislature by a petition sponsored by Tim Eyman. The initiative would cap taxes on certain cars at $30 and put an end to transportation benefit districts and other local vehicle taxes. The campaign in favor of the initiative was led by Tim Eyman, Permanent Offense, and Voters Want More Choices, while the campaign against the initiative was led by the Northwest Progressive Institute. Opponents of the initiative fear that its passage would take away money from ongoing transportation projects, including voter-approved measures, such as Sound Transit 3, while supporters claim that the initiative would end assessing practices that they claim are dishonest. The practices include using out-dated fee schedules for assessing vehicles. Unsuccessful attempts were made to require the use of more recent fee schedules in the state legislature.

The ballot measure was passed, with 53 percent of voters in favor at the time of certification. The governments of Seattle and King County, along with other groups from across the state, announced plans to halt the initiative through legal action, disputing the ballot language as "misleading to voters". A judge in the King County Superior Court issued a temporary injunction in November 2019 and the case is pending further action.

In February 2020, the King County Superior Court largely upheld I-976, but kept the measure on hold pending a ruling from the Washington State Supreme Court. In October, Washington State Supreme Court struck down the initiative on constitutional grounds because it "contain[ed] more than one subject and its subject is not accurately expressed in its title".

References

2019 Washington (state) ballot measures
2019 in Washington (state)